Basharat may refer to:

Places
Başarat,  Azerbaijan
Basharat, Chakwal, Pakistan
Basharat Mosque, in Pedro Abad, Spain

People
Basharat Peer (born 1977), Indian writer
Basharat Hassan (born 1944), Kenyan cricketer 
Shahab Basharat (born 1987), Pakistani cricketer
Basharat Ahmad (1876–1943), member of the Lahore Ahmadiyya Movement

Other uses
Daily Basharat, Urdu newspaper published from Karachi